Winona, Wynona or Wynonna may refer to:

Places

Canada
 Winona, Ontario

United States
 Winona, Arizona
 Winona, Indiana
 Winona Lake, Indiana
 Winona, Kansas
 Winona, Michigan
 Winona County, Minnesota
 Winona, Minnesota, the seat of Winona County
 Winona, Mississippi
 Winona, Missouri
 Winona, Ohio
 Winona, Tennessee (disambiguation), several places
 Winona, Texas
 Winona (Norfolk, Virginia), a national historic district
 Winona, West Virginia
 Winona, Taylor County, West Virginia
 East Winona, Wisconsin

Other uses 
 Winona (name), including a list of people named Winona, Wynona or Wynonna
 Winona (horse), a racehorse
 Winona (Winona, Virginia), U.S., a historic home
 The Roman Catholic Diocese of Winona-Rochester, Minnesota, United States

See also 
 Lake Winona (disambiguation)
 Wenona (disambiguation)
 Wenonah (disambiguation)
 Wynona, Oklahoma